Events in the year 2023 in Trinidad and Tobago.

Incumbents
 President: Paula-Mae Weekes
 Prime Minister: Keith Rowley
 Chief Justice: Ivor Archie
 Leader of the Opposition: Kamla Persad-Bissessar

Events
Ongoing — COVID-19 pandemic in Trinidad and Tobago

 January 20 – 2023 Trinidad and Tobago presidential election

References

 
2020s in Trinidad and Tobago
Years of the 21st century in Trinidad and Tobago
Trinidad and Tobago
Trinidad and Tobago